Manduca muscosa, the muscosa sphinx, is a moth of the  family Sphingidae.

Distribution 
It is found from southern and western Arizona in tropical and subtropical lowlands and premontane forests and oak woodland, then south through Mexico, Belize, Guatemala, Nicaragua and Costa Rica.

Description 
The wingspan is 100–126 mm. It is similar to Manduca sesquiplex  but the forewing is much less elongate, the ground colour of the body and wings is darker, almost olive and the pale bands on the hindwing are less prominent.

Biology 
There is one generation per year with adults on wing from mid-July to early August in southern Arizona. In Costa Rica, adults are on wing from May to November.

The larvae feed on Verbesina gigantea, Lasianthaea fruticosa, Eupatorium albicaule, Viguiera dentate, Eupatorium albicaule, Lantana camara, Helianthus annuus and Jacaranda caroba.

References

External links
Muscosa sphinx Moths of North America Guide

Manduca
Moths described in 1903
Taxa named by Karl Jordan
Taxa named by Walter Rothschild